The Communauté de communes Osartis Marquion is a communauté de communes, an intercommunal structure, in the Pas-de-Calais department, in the Hauts-de-France region, northern France. It was created in January 2014 by the merger of the former communautés de communes Osartis and Marquion. Its area is 330.6 km2, and its population was 42,277 in 2018. Its seat is in Vitry-en-Artois.

Composition
The communauté de communes consists of the following 49 communes:

Arleux-en-Gohelle
Baralle
Bellonne
Biache-Saint-Vaast
Boiry-Notre-Dame
Bourlon
Brebières
Buissy
Cagnicourt
Corbehem
Dury
Écourt-Saint-Quentin
Épinoy
Étaing
Éterpigny
Fresnes-lès-Montauban
Fresnoy-en-Gohelle
Gouy-sous-Bellonne
Graincourt-lès-Havrincourt
Hamblain-les-Prés
Haucourt
Hendecourt-lès-Cagnicourt
Inchy-en-Artois
Izel-lès-Équerchin
Lagnicourt-Marcel
Marquion
Neuvireuil
Noyelles-sous-Bellonne
Oisy-le-Verger
Oppy
Palluel
Pelves
Plouvain
Pronville-en-Artois
Quéant
Quiéry-la-Motte
Récourt
Rémy
Riencourt-lès-Cagnicourt
Rumaucourt
Sailly-en-Ostrevent
Sains-lès-Marquion
Sauchy-Cauchy
Sauchy-Lestrée
Saudemont
Tortequesne
Villers-lès-Cagnicourt
Vis-en-Artois
Vitry-en-Artois

References

Commune communities in France
Intercommunalities of Pas-de-Calais